The American Revolution: A Constitutional Interpretation is a book by Charles Howard McIlwain. It won the 1924 Pulitzer Prize for History.

References 

Pulitzer Prize for History-winning works